Re-Rapped by Request is the fifth album by Pittsburgh pop/rock band the Jaggerz, released in 2001. It contains their most requested songs.

Track listing 
 "Dancin' in the Streets/Some Kind of Wonderful" (live)
 "Never Found Me a Girl"
 "It's Gonna Take a Miracle/I'm on the Outside Looking In"
 "The Whole Town's Laughing at Me"
 "(Let's Get Loose) Pass the Juice"
 "Shakin' the Shack"
 "(I Got Everything I Need) Almost"
 "The Love I Never Had"
 "It's Gonna Take a Miracle/I'm on the Outside Lokking In" (long version)
 "Outside Help"
 "Whose That Knockin'"
 "The Rapper" (live)

References 

2001 albums
The Jaggerz albums